Centotheca is a genus of African, Asian, and Pacific Island plants in the grass family.

 Species
 Centotheca lappacea (L.) Desv. - tropical western + central Africa; Madagascar, China, Southeast Asia, New Guinea, numerous islands of the Pacific aka หญ้า ฮี ยุ่ม hee yum grass in Thai
 Centotheca philippinensis (Merr.) C.Monod - Philippines, New Guinea
 Centotheca uniflora Swallen - Vietnam

 formerly included

 Centotheca madagascariensis - Megastachya madagascariensis
 Centotheca malabarica - Diplachne fusca
 Centotheca maxima - Megastachya mucronata
 Centotheca mucronata - Megastachya mucronata
 Centotheca owariensis - Megastachya mucronata
 Centotheca urekana - Megastachya mucronata

See also
 List of Poaceae genera

References

Panicoideae
Poaceae genera